Unisa may refer to:
 University of South Africa
 University of South Australia
 University of Salerno, in Italy
 University of Santo Amaro, in Brazil
 Unisa Bangura (born 1987), Sierra Leonean footballer